The Herbert H. Dow House is an historic house located in the Dow Gardens of Midland, Michigan.  Built in 1899, it was the home of Herbert H. Dow (b. 1866), founder of Dow Chemical Company, from then until his death in 1930.  It was declared a National Historic Landmark in 1976.  The house is open for guided tours; admission is charged.

Description and history
The Herbert H. Dow House stands within Dow Gardens, now a public park.  It is an architecturally vernacular -story wood-frame structure, with a diversity of projections, roof styles, and window sizes and shapes.  It is not considered to be architecturally significant.  The house was built in 1899 for Herbert H. Dow, and is now owned by the Herbert and Grace Dow Foundation.

Herbert Dow, born in Canada and raised in Connecticut, received a Bachelor of Science degree in 1888, focused on chemistry, from the Case School of Applied Science.  He immediately pursued research to separate bromine from salt brine, since bromine was recognized as an important chemical with applications in photography and medicine.  He moved to Midland in 1890 because the brine in the region was particularly rich in bromine, and his refinement of the techniques of separating it led to the formal founding of Dow Chemical in 1897.  Dow's work and patents in this area laid the groundwork for what is now the modern chemical industry.

Dow was also interested in horticulture, developing extensive gardens near his home.  This land is now the Dow Gardens public park.

See also
List of National Historic Landmarks in Michigan
National Register of Historic Places listings in Midland County, Michigan

References

External links

Dow Gardens House web site

National Historic Landmarks in Michigan
Midland, Michigan
Houses in Midland County, Michigan
Houses completed in 1899
National Register of Historic Places in Midland County, Michigan
Houses on the National Register of Historic Places in Michigan